Franz Rademacher (20 February 1906 – 17 March 1973) was a German lawyer and diplomat. As an official in the Nazi government of the Third Reich during World War II, he was known for initiating action on the Madagascar Plan.

Nazi beginnings

Rademacher was born on 20 February 1906 in Neustrelitz, Mecklenburg-Strelitz. His father was a railway engineer. He studied law in Rostock and Munich, and entered the profession as a jurist in April 1932.  He held membership in the Sturmabteilung (Nazi stormtroopers) between 1932 and 1934. In 1933, he joined the Nazi Party. He was a vocal anti-semite.

From 1937, he was a diplomat with the German Foreign Office, serving at the German embassy in Montevideo, Uruguay until May 1940. In 1940, he was selected to lead Referat D III, or Judenreferat, of Ribbentrop's Foreign Affairs Ministry.  His direct superior was Nazi diplomat Martin Luther. It was during his tenure in this office, throughout the spring and summer of 1940, that Rademacher initiated the Madagascar Plan, which sought to forcibly deport all of Europe's Jews to the island of Madagascar. He clashed briefly with Adolf Eichmann over organizational control of the plan, which would shortly be abandoned amidst Germany's changing fortunes in World War II.

In October 1941, he was responsible for mass deportations and executions of Serbian Jews. He also had a hand in the deportation of Jews from France, Belgium, and the Netherlands. After his visit to Belgrade, Rademacher  filed an expense claim  stating that the official purpose of the trip was to "liquidate the Jews." In 2010, the German Foreign Ministry released an 880-page report on the diplomats of the Third Reich entitled The Ministry and the Past (Das Amt und die Vergangenheit), which mentioned that particular expense claim, bringing  Rademacher a degree of latter-day notoriety.

In 1943, Rademacher became embroiled in Luther's attempted coup to oust Ribbentrop. He was dismissed from the Foreign Affairs Ministry, and sent to fight in the navy as an officer for the remainder of the war, ending up with Admiral Doenitz' cypher-breaking unit at Flensburg-Mürwik under the command of Captain Kupfer. Immediately following the war this unit was put at the disposal of Sefton Delmer's news agency in Hamburg. Rademacher was arrested by British military police in November 1945, who ultimately released him. He was eventually brought to trial in West Germany in February 1952 for the murders he supervised in Serbia. However, with the aid of Nazi sympathizers, he fled to Syria in September of that year while released on bail. A German court convicted him in absentia for the murder of Serbian Jews, and sentenced him to 3 years and 5 months imprisonment.

Later years
In 1962, Israeli spy Eli Cohen delivered a letter bomb to Rademacher in a failed assassination attempt. In 1963, he was arrested in Syria on charges of spying, but was released in 1965 due to ill health. He returned voluntarily to West Germany on 30 November 1966, where he was arrested at the Nuremberg airport. Reportedly ill at the time, he was taken to a prison hospital in Bayreuth, while awaiting prosecution in Bamberg. He was again convicted of war crimes and sentenced to five and half years' imprisonment. However, his sentence was never carried out, the court having considered it already served. In 1971, a German high court in Karlsruhe overruled this judgment against Rademacher, and ordered a new trial for his crimes during World War II. He died on 17 March 1973, before proceedings began.

References

Further reading

External links
"Historian Calls Wartime Ministry A 'Criminal Organization'" Spiegel Online interview of  historian Eckart Conze (2010)

1906 births
1973 deaths
Ambassadors of Germany to Uruguay
People from Neustrelitz
History of Madagascar
Nazi Party officials
People from Mecklenburg-Strelitz
Holocaust perpetrators in Yugoslavia
Planning the Holocaust
Sturmabteilung personnel
Jewish Serbian history
Serbia in World War II
People of the Federal Intelligence Service
German people convicted of war crimes